Tradewind Aviation, LLC, doing business as Tradewind Aviation and Tradewind Shuttle, is an American airline headquartered at the Waterbury-Oxford Airport  in Oxford, Connecticut, United States. Tradewind Aviation provides shared charter in the Northeast and the Caribbean, as well as aircraft management services. The air charter company is best known for its Westchester to Nantucket summer ticket books, and its Puerto Rico to St. Barths scheduled service.

History 
Founded in 2001, Tradewind Aviation commenced operations utilizing a single Cessna Caravan. Charter service expanded throughout America and the Caribbean, spanning eleven cities. To provide the highest quality service, each domestic Tradewind scheduled service flight within the United States departs and arrives at an FBO.

Caribbean network flights operate from normal terminals.  Tradewind offers premium service at Luis Muñoz Marín International Airport in San Juan with a semi-private lounge area while customers await their trips to the high-end Caribbean destinations served by Tradewind.  Tradewind operates year-round service to Gustaf III Airport in St. Barthelemy, providing the only year-round, nonstop scheduled service between this ultra-luxe French territory and the United States, which it has operated since 2006.

In June 2019, Tradewind launched a jet card, called "Goodspeed." The program offers fixed, one-way rates on its PC-12 fleet in two service areas, 300 nautical miles from Westchester County Airport in New York and San Juan Luis Muñoz Marín Airport in the Caribbean. Jet cards are offered in 10, 25 and 40-hour denominations.

Destinations 
Tradewind Aviation operates scheduled flights to the following destinations:

Fleet 

 Tradewind's fleet consists of the following aircraft:

On March 1, 2022, Tradewind Aviation, in partnership with Pilatus Aircraft, announced that it would take delivery of 20 Pilatus PC-12 NGX aircraft between the third quarter of 2022 and 2027, at a rate of four aircraft per year. The order marks a doubling of Tradewind's fleet and cements the relationship that Tradewind has had with Pilatus since beginning to operate the PC-12 in 2003. Between 2001 and the early 2010s, Tradewind also operated a fleet of Cessna 208B Grand Caravans, and has also managed a variety of other aircraft for clients.

See also
 List of airlines of the United States

References

External links

 

Regional airlines of the United States
Airlines established in 2001
Charter airlines of the United States
Airlines based in Connecticut
Oxford, Connecticut
Companies based in New Haven County, Connecticut
2001 establishments in Connecticut
American companies established in 2001